Piano Girl is a 2009 Turkish comedy-drama film, directed by Murat Saraçoğlu, starring Tarık Akan and Şerif Sezer as two elderly people forced to question their histories and reveal their big secrets.

The defunct Today's Zaman mistakenly stated that both Mishka and Popuch were "Molokan". Mihska was the last Russian and Malakan, and Popuch was Turkish Muslim.

Plot 
After the Russo-Turkish War of 1877–1878, Russia acquired part of eastern Anatolia, including Kars province. To quickly populate the area with Russians, undesirable heretics, Spiritual Christians, from Russia (Malakan in Turkish) were given incentives (more land, military exemption, no taxes) to resettle in Kars Oblast in eastern Anatolia.

Among the resettled families is Mişka's (Mishka is Russian for "little Micheal"). They operated a water-powered grain mill along a river. Mişka (Tarik Akan) grows old, buries his brother, and now operates the only mill in the village. He cannot compete with new electric 
mills. He tries to sell apples to pay his bills.

In the meantime, the cranky old woman of the village, Popuç (Şerif Sezer), hates Mişka and does not want him in the village. She owns the store to which poor Mişka owes money. Dreamy flashbacks reveal that Mişka and Popuç fell in love in their youth and his Christian parents forbid him to marry outside their faith. The young Mişka and Popuç are played by the actual children of the parent actors.

Popuç lives with her son Semistan (Levent Tülek), daughter-in-law Figan (Zuhal Topal) and three grandchildren. However, the smallest and most wayward of her granddaughters, Alma, is musically talented and befriends the elder Mişka who teaches her on his old piano, and pays for her education at the Kars music academy. Alma will help two elderly people question their histories and reveal their big secrets.

When Mişka dies, Popuç with a change of heart, intervenes because she is the only Muslim who knows how to properly bury a Christian Malakan.

Cast 
 Tarık Akan as Mişka
 Şerif Sezer as Popuç
 Zuhal Topal as Figan
 Levent Tülek as Şemsitan
 Korel Cezayirli as Metin Öğretmen
 Murat Aydın as Fezo
 Ozan Erdoğan as Tavşan
 Muhammet Cangören as Allahyar
 Levent Uzunbilek as Mirza
 İsrafil Parlak as Adıbeş
 Havin Funda Saç as Esme

Release

General release 

Festival screenings 
 2009
Sinema Burada Film Festival
46th Antalya Golden Orange Film Festival
4th Bursa International Silk Road Film Festival
 2010
21st Ankara International Film Festival

Reception

Box office
The film reached number five in the Turkish box office chart and has made a total gross of $614,899.

Reviews
Terry Richardson, writing for Today's Zaman, describes the comic drama as, Entertaining if melodramatic.

Some reviewers noted there was little information about the Malakan people.

See also 
 2009 in film
 Turkish films of 2009

References

External links
 
 
 

2009 films
2000s historical comedy-drama films
Films set in Turkey
2009 comedy films
Turkish historical comedy-drama films
2009 drama films
2000s Turkish-language films